is a judo tournament held every year in Japan. The men's tournament is held in Nippon Budokan on 29 April and the women's tournament (dubbed "Empress cup All-Japan women's Judo championships") is held in Yokohama Cultural Gymnasium in April. The Kodokan and All Japan Judo Federation sponsor the championship.

This tournament has only one open-weight division.

For Japanese Judoka, this is one of the three major judo titles, along with the Olympic Games and World Championships.
Since 2011 All Japan Judo Championship is fought with International rules.

Records

Men

 Most titles
Yasuhiro Yamashita : 9 titles
Naoya Ogawa : 7 titles
Masahiko Kimura : 4 titles
Keiji Suzuki : 4 titles
Most Participation
Yasuyuki Muneta : 15 times
Katsuyuki Masuchi : 13 times
Isamu Sonoda : 12 times
Jun Konno : 12 times
Naoto Yabu : 12 times
Youngest champion
Satoshi Ishii : Champion at 19 years and 4 months of age in 2006
Yasuhiro Yamashita : Champion at 19 years and 10 months of age in 1977
Lightest champion
Isao Okano : 79 kg in 1969 and 80 kg in 1967

Women
 Most titles
Maki Tsukada : 9 titles
Yoko Tanabe : 6 titles
Noriko Anno : 5 titles
Miho Ninomiya : 2 titles
 Youngest champion
 Sarah Asahina – Champion at 20 years and 8 months of age in 2017

Recent Winners

Men

2018 – Hisayoshi Harasawa
2017 – Takeshi Ojitani
2016 – Takeshi Ojitani
2015 – Hisayoshi Harasawa
2014 – Takeshi Ojitani
2013 – Takamasa Anai
2012 – Hirotaka Kato
2011 – Keiji Suzuki
2010 – Kazuhiko Takahashi
2009 – Takamasa Anai
2008 – Satoshi Ishii
2007 – Keiji Suzuki
2006 – Satoshi Ishii

Women
2017 – Sarah Asahina
2016 – Kanae Yamabe
2015 – Megumi Tachimoto
2014 – Kanae Yamabe
2013 – Akari Ogata
2012 – Kanae Yamabe
2011 – Mika Sugimoto
2010 – Maki Tsukada
2009 – Maki Tsukada
2008 – Maki Tsukada
2007 – Maki Tsukada
2006 – Maki Tsukada

References

External links

Kodokan
All-Japan Judo Federation

Judo competitions in Japan
National championships in Japan